Om Prakash Tyagi (1912- 1986)  was a leader of Bharatiya Jan Sangh from Uttar Pradesh.  He was a member of the 4th Lok Sabha from Moradabad and 6th Lok Sabha from  Bahraich. He lost from Bahraich in 1971 and 1980. After losing his bid for a place in Lok Sabha in 1971, he served as a member of the Rajya Sabha from 1972 to 1977. 

He was born in 1912 in Bulandshahr District. He studied at Banaras Hindu University. He took active part in the "Quit India" movement in 1942 and was imprisoned. He was associated with Arya Samaj and RSS. He was founder President of Arya Veer Dal. Later he joined Jan Sangh. He was involved with Bharatiya Mazdoor Sangh too . He wrote a number of books on religion, social and political themes. In 1978 he introduced Freedom of Religion Bill as a private bill in Lok Sabha to make 'fraudulent' conversions illegal.

References

1912 births
1986 deaths
People from Bulandshahr district
Arya Samajis
Bharatiya Jana Sangh politicians
Rajya Sabha members from Uttar Pradesh
Lok Sabha members from Uttar Pradesh
India MPs 1967–1970
India MPs 1977–1979
Banaras Hindu University alumni
Bharatiya Janata Party politicians from Uttar Pradesh